Lidberg is a Swedish surname. Notable persons with that name include:

Cully Lidberg (1900–1987), American football player
Isac Lidberg (b. 1998), Swedish football player
Jimmy Lidberg (born 1982), Swedish wrestler
Martin Lidberg (born 1973), Swedish wrestler
Paul Lidberg (fl. 1990s–present), US game designer

See also
 Lindberg (surname)